, also romanized as Enkei, was a  after Tokuji and before Ōchō. This period spanned the years from October 1308 through April 1311.

Change of era
 1308, also called : The new era name was created to mark the accession of Emperor Hanazono.  The previous era ended and the new one commenced in Tokuji 3.

Events of the Enkyō era
Initially, former-Emperor Fushimi administered the court up through the time he took the tonsure as a Buddhist monk, which happened after this nengō ended.
 1308 (Enkyō 1): At the death of Emperor Go-Nijō, Hanazono accedes to the Chrysanthemum Throne at age 12 years; and  Takaharu-shinnō, the second son of former-Emperor Go-Uda is elevated as the heir apparent under the direction of the Kamakura shogunate.
 1308 (Enkyō 1, 10th month): Kujō Moronori resigns his position as sesshō; and he is replaced in that role by Takatsukasa Fuyuhira.
 1309 (Enkyō 2, 2nd month): Konoe Iehira is elevated to the position of sadaijin.
 1310 (Enkyō 3, 11th month): The Rokuhara Tandai in Kyoto, Hōjō Sadafusa, died and Hōjō Tokiatsu was named to take his place as Kyoto representative of the military government in Kamakura.

Notes

References
 Nussbaum, Louis-Frédéric and Käthe Roth. (2005).  Japan encyclopedia. Cambridge: Harvard University Press. ;  OCLC 58053128
 Ponsonby-Fane, Richard Arthur Brabazon. (1959).  The Imperial House of Japan. Kyoto: Ponsonby Memorial Society. OCLC 194887
 Titsingh, Isaac. (1834). Nihon Odai Ichiran; ou,  Annales des empereurs du Japon.  Paris: Royal Asiatic Society, Oriental Translation Fund of Great Britain and Ireland. OCLC 5850691
 Varley, H. Paul. (1980). A Chronicle of Gods and Sovereigns: Jinnō Shōtōki of Kitabatake Chikafusa. New York: Columbia University Press.  ;  OCLC 6042764

External links
 National Diet Library, "The Japanese Calendar" -- historical overview plus illustrative images from library's collection

Japanese eras
1300s in Japan
1310s in Japan